Alonso Pérez de Guzmán (1256–1309), known as Guzmán el Bueno ("Guzmán the Good"), was a Spanish nobleman and hero of Spain during the medieval period, the founder of the line from which the dukes of Medina Sidonia descend.

Biography
Alonso Pérez de Guzmán was born on 24 January 1256, probably in León, bastard son of Pedro Núñez de Guzmán, adelantado mayor de Castilla (governor) Although according to Spanish tradition, Guzmán was born in Morocco. Historians have since speculated that he was a Muslim. In a permit to export wheat signed in 1288, Guzmán was given permission to export the crop to where "he is from", very likely in Morocco. A document from 1297 signed by the Spanish king refers to Guzmán as "a vassal", i.e. a non-Spaniard. The document was owned by the late Luisa Isabel Álvarez de Toledo, 21st Duchess of Medina Sidonia. A direct descendant of Guzmán, she said that she believed his history might have been "cleaned up" in the sixteenth century to alter his origins. She thought that would have made the hero more palatable to Spain's Christian society.

In 1294 Guzmán was granted tuna fishing rights by King Sancho IV of Castile in reward for his heroic defence of Tarifa. He built the Castle of Zahara de los Atunes and Palace of Jadraza as a defensive castle, which incorporated a seasonal residential palace and tuna processing facility.

In 1296 Alonso de Guzmán defended the town of Tarifa on behalf of Sancho IV of Castile.  Guzmán had been given charge of Tarifa, recently captured from the Moors, despite having fought for Alfonso X against the rebellion of his son Sancho IV.  Guzmán held Tarifa's castle against the siege of the Moors and the Infante Don Juan, Sancho's rebellious brother. Guzmán's son had been placed under the care of Don Juan, who threatened to kill the captive unless Guzmán surrendered the city.  

According to legend, Guzmán rebuffed the demand with dramatic words. According to one rendition, 
"I did not beget a son to be made use of against my country, but that he should serve her against her foes. Should Don Juan put him to death, he will but confer honour on me, true life on my son, and on himself eternal shame in this world and everlasting wrath after death."Guzman reportedly threw down his knife for the besiegers to use in killing his son.

He was rewarded for his defense of the castle with large grants of Crown land. In 1309 Guzmán helped Ferdinand IV of Castile capture Gibraltar from the Moors, who had held it for nearly 600 years since 711.

The ducal title was conferred by John II in 1445 on one of his descendants, Juan Alonzo de Guzmán, count of Niebla. The addition "El Bueno" to the family name of Guzmán was used by several of his descendants, who have included statesmen, generals and colonial viceroys.

Legacy
Guzmán and his life have been explored by numerous Spanish playwrights, including Antonio Gil y Zárate in his Guzmán el bueno. Drama en Cuatro Actos, 1840s. 
Luis Velez de Guevara (1570–1644), Más pesa el Rey que la Sangre
Moratín Sr. (1737–1780), play dated 1777 
The Guzmán el Bueno metro stop in Madrid is named in his honor, and a street where the Madrid Civil Guard barracks is.
 Alonso appears in the scene of the dagger, in the play Anthology theatrical by the author Juan José Videgain, recognized as his descendant.

See also
 Dukes of Medina Sidonia
 Siege of Gibraltar (1309)

Notes

Sources

1256 births
1309 deaths
People from León, Spain
Alonso
Spanish Muslims
Spanish generals